Émile Drain (1890–1966) was a French actor and comedian.

In 1925, he starred as Napoleon with Gloria Swanson in Madame Sans-Gene. In 1927 he played Napoleon in the Donald Crisp directed The Fighting Eagle. In 1948, he appeared, again as Napoleon, in the film The Lame Devil.

Selected filmography

Après la chute de l'aigle (1909)
Androcles and the Lion (1911)
Trois Familles (Three Families) (1918)
Papa bon cœur (1919) - Marcel Daubenton
La Double Existence du docteur Mozart (1919) - Docteur André
Un drame sous (Drama With Napoleon) (1921) - Napoleon
L'Aiglonne (1921) - Napoleon
Molière, sa vie, son œuvre (1922)
Château historique (1923)
After Love (1924)
Madam Sans-Gene (1925) - Napoleon
The Fighting Eagle (1927)
 Madame Récamier (1928) - Napoleon
L'Étrangère (The Stranger) (1931) - M. Mauriceau
L'Aiglon (The Eagle) (1931) - Napoleon
 Imperial Violets (1932)
 Casanova (1934) - Monseigneur de Bernis
La vie est à nous (1936) - Old Bertin
Le Perles de la couronne (1937) - Napoleon
Remontons les Champs-Élysées (1938) - Napoleon
La rue sans joie (Joyless Road) (1938) - President
Le Bal de passants (1943) - Dr. Baudouin
Master Love (1945)
Panique (Panic (1946)  - M. Breteuil
La Kermesse rouge (1946) - a Dominican reverend
La Revanche de Roger la Honte (1946)
Les Portes de la nuit (Night Gates) (1946)
Antoine and Antoinete (Antoine et Antoinette) (1946)
Les amoureux sont seuls au monde (1947) - a critic
Croisière pour l'inconnu (1947)
Le Diamant de cent sous (1947)
The Scarlet Bazaar (1947)
The Lame Devil (1948) - Napoleon
La Marie du Port (1949)
Superpacific (1949)
Justice est faite (1950) - Prof. Dutoit
Si Versailles m'était conté... (1953) - Napoleon
Si Paris nous était conté (1955) - Victor Hugo
Le Pays d'où je viens (1956)

Theatre

Bibliography
Paul Bauer, Deux siècles d'histoire au Père Lachaise, Mémoire et Documents, 2006, p. 291

External links

1890 births
1966 deaths
French male film actors
French male silent film actors
French comedians
20th-century French male actors
20th-century French comedians